The 685th Aircraft Control and Warning Squadron is an inactive United States Air Force unit. It was last assigned to the Oklahoma City Air Defense Sector, Aerospace Defense Command, stationed at Las Cruces Air Force Station, New Mexico. It was inactivated on 1 August 1963.

The unit was a General Surveillance Radar squadron providing for the air defense of the United States.

Lineage
 Established as 685th Aircraft Control and Warning Squadron
 Activated on 27 November 1950
 Inactivated on 6 February 1952
 Activated on 1 December 1953
 Discontinued on 1 August 1963

Assignments
 544th Aircraft Control and Warning Group, 27 November 1950 - 6 February 1952
 4702d Defense Wing, 1 December 1953
 34th Air Division, 1 January 1954
 Albuquerque Air Defense Sector, 1 January 1960
 Oklahoma City Air Defense Sector, 15 September 1960
 4752d Air Defense Wing, 1 September 1961
 Oklahoma City Air Defense Sector, 25 June 1963 - 1 August 1963

Stations
 Norton AFB, California, 1 January 1951 - 6 February 1952
 Geiger Field, Washington, 1 December 1953
 Kirtland AFB, New Mexico, 1 January 1954
 Las Cruces AFS, New Mexico, 1 December 1954 – 1 August 1963

References

  Cornett, Lloyd H. and Johnson, Mildred W., A Handbook of Aerospace Defense Organization  1946 - 1980,  Office of History, Aerospace Defense Center, Peterson AFB, CO (1980).
 Winkler, David F. & Webster, Julie L., Searching the Skies, The Legacy of the United States Cold War Defense Radar Program,  US Army Construction Engineering Research Laboratories, Champaign, IL (1997).

External links

Radar squadrons of the United States Air Force
Aerospace Defense Command units